María Catalina Usme Pineda (born 25 December 1989), known as Catalina Usme, is a Colombian footballer who plays as a forward for América de Cali and the Colombia women's national team.

Club career
Usme has played the Copa Libertadores with Formas Íntimas and most recently America de Cali. In 2015, she won the top-scorer award with eight goals in three matches.

International career
Usme is a member of the Colombian national team, playing the 2011 and 2015 FIFA Women's World Cups, and the 2012 and 2016 Olympics.

Football Career Transfers and Statistics 
We are going to show you the list of football clubs and seasons in which Maria Catalina Usme Pineda has played. It includes the total number of appearance (caps), substitution details, goals, yellow and red cards stats.

International goals
.Scores and results are list Colombia's goal tally first

Managerial career
In 2012, Usme was the manager for Independiente Medellín junior women's team.

References

1989 births
Living people
Sportspeople from Antioquia Department
Colombian women's footballers
Women's association football forwards
América de Cali (women) players
Independiente Santa Fe (women) players
Colombia women's international footballers
2011 FIFA Women's World Cup players
2015 FIFA Women's World Cup players
Olympic footballers of Colombia
Footballers at the 2012 Summer Olympics
Footballers at the 2016 Summer Olympics
Footballers at the 2015 Pan American Games
Pan American Games gold medalists for Colombia
Pan American Games medalists in football
Footballers at the 2019 Pan American Games
Medalists at the 2019 Pan American Games
Medalists at the 2015 Pan American Games
21st-century Colombian women